Julius Marshuetz Mayer (September 5, 1865 – November 20, 1925) was a United States circuit judge of the United States Court of Appeals for the Second Circuit and previously was a United States District Judge of the United States District Court for the Southern District of New York.

Education and career

Born on September 5, 1865, in New York City, New York, Mayer received an Artium Baccalaureus degree in 1884 from the City College of New York and a Bachelor of Laws in 1886 from Columbia Law. He entered private practice in New York City from 1886 to 1912. He was counsel for the New York State Excise Board from 1895 to 1896. He was counsel for the New York City Building Department from 1897 to 1898. He was a Justice of the New York Court of Special Sessions from 1902 to 1903. He was Attorney General of New York from 1903 to 1907.

Federal judicial service

Mayer was nominated by President William Howard Taft on February 19, 1912, to a seat on the United States District Court for the Southern District of New York vacated by Judge George B. Adams. He was confirmed by the United States Senate on February 26, 1912, and received his commission the same day. His service terminated on October 13, 1921, due to his elevation to the Second Circuit.

Mayer was nominated by President Warren G. Harding on September 22, 1921, to a seat on the United States Court of Appeals for the Second Circuit vacated by Judge Henry Galbraith Ward. He was confirmed by the Senate on October 5, 1921, and received his commission the same day. His service terminated on July 31, 1924, due to his resignation.

Later career and death

After his resignation from the federal bench, Mayer resumed private practice in New York City from 1924 to 1925. He died on November 20, 1925, in New York City.

See also
 List of Jewish American jurists

References

Sources
 
 

 
 

1865 births
1925 deaths
Columbia Law School alumni
New York State Attorneys General
Judges of the United States District Court for the Southern District of New York
United States district court judges appointed by William Howard Taft
20th-century American judges
Judges of the United States Court of Appeals for the Second Circuit
United States court of appeals judges appointed by Warren G. Harding